Chris Mandalidis (born 10 January 1975) is an Australian former rugby league footballer who played in the 1990s. He played for the Newcastle Knights from 1999/2000
Chris also played with the ACT brumbies in 1997/1998 and represented Australia at U17,19 and 21 level.
Australian barbarians representative  in 2001.

External links
http://www.rugbyleagueproject.org/players/Chris_Mandalidis/summary.html

1975 births
Living people
Australian Barbarians players
Australian rugby league players
Australian rugby union players
ACT Brumbies players
Newcastle Knights players
Place of birth missing (living people)
Rugby articles needing expert attention